CityLine Hungary Ltd. was a Hungarian charter airline based at Budapest Ferihegy International Airport. The airline had its headquarters in Vecsés, Hungary.

History

The airline was founded in March 2003 with the aim of providing cargo operations to European, African and CIS countries with two Antonov An-26B aircraft. In 2009, the airline began operating passenger flights from Milan-Malpensa Airport in Italy to holiday destinations with a Boeing 737-200 aircraft. CityLine Hungary employed 120+ employees in May 2010.  The company slogan was Wings for your cargo by CityLine Hungary.

Subsidiaries
CityLine Hungary had the following subsidiaries (at May 2010):

 CityLine Germany
 CityLine Ukraine
 CityLine Swiss

Fleet
The CityLine Hungary fleet consisted of the following aircraft (at March 2018):

Boeing 737-200 HA-LEW was stored in 2011 and having completed its post-overhaul test flight on April 24, 2014, has been sold to Nolinor Aviation of Canada.

References

External links

Defunct airlines of Hungary
Airlines established in 2003
Airlines disestablished in 2015
Hungarian companies established in 2003
2015 disestablishments in Hungary